Richard Harrison (1646–1726) was an English politician.

Richard was educated at Peterhouse, Cambridge, where he matriculated in 1663 and was admitted to the Middle Temple that same year.

Harrison was elected Member of Parliament in 1669, and again in 1679. Thought to favour the court in the Exclusion Crisis, he did not support James II on the throne. After the Glorious Revolution he was a non-juror.

Family
Harrison married in 1668 Audrey, daughter of George Villiers, 4th Viscount Grandison; they had eight sons and six daughters.

George (born 1680) was the second surviving son (born fifth), and succeeded Edward as Member of Parliament for Hertford in 1727.

Notes

1646 births
1726 deaths
English MPs 1661–1679
English MPs 1679
Alumni of Peterhouse, Cambridge
Members of the Middle Temple